Jan Torsten Mybrand (born 26 January 1959 in Kolsva, Köping Municipality, Sweden) is a Swedish actor.

Mybrand was educated at Dramatens elevskola and after that he practised at Gävle Folkteater. Since 1986 he works at Stockholm City Theatre

Selected filmography

1987: Nionde kompaniet - Persson
1990: Black Jack - Kaj
1992: House of Angels - Per-Ove Ågren
1992: Jönssonligan och den svarta diamanten - Vårdare
1993: Sista dansen - Journalist (uncredited)
1994: Änglagård – andra sommaren - Per-Ove Ågren
1995: Jönssonligans största kupp - Nattvakten
1995-1997: Sjukan (TV Series) - Patrik Larsson
1996: Jerusalem - Gabriel
1996: The Disappearance of Finbar - Immigration Officer
1997: Selma & Johanna – en roadmovie - Per
1997: Kalle Blomkvist och Rasmus - Professor
1998: Beck (TV Series) - Karlberg
1999: Vägen ut - Ralf
1999: Stjärnsystrar - Johan
2000: Det blir aldrig som man tänkt sig - Christoffer
2000: Hundhotellet – En mystisk historia - Picasso (voice)
2000: Vingar av glas - Priest
2001: Sprängaren - Olof Faltin
2002: C/o Segemyhr (TV)
2004: Kärlekens språk - Ulf
2005: Kommissionen (TV Series) - Leif, skolminister
2007: Underbar och älskad av alla - Boström
2008: Vi hade i alla fall tur med vädret – igen - Hans
2009: Män som hatar kvinnor - Economic director (uncredited)
2009: Kenny Begins - Rutger Oversmart
2009: Wallander (TV Series) - Greger Frankman
2009: Mannen under trappan (TV Mini-Series) - Ulf
2009: Mera ur kärlekens språk - Ulf
2009: Playa del Sol (TV Series) - Krister Aspelin
2010: Kommissarie Späck - Roger
2010: Änglagård – tredje gången gillt - Per-Ove Ågren
2017: Same Same - Mr. Lonely
2017: The Wife - Arvid Engdahl
2018: Tårtgeneralen - Helicopter Pilot
2020: Pool - Micke

References

External links

Swedish male film actors
1959 births
Living people
People from Köping Municipality